

Hermann-Göring-Straßen
 Berlin: Ebertstraße
 Düsseldorf: Benrather Straße
 Gladbeck: Horster Straße 
 Kalisz: Al. Wolności 
 München: Liebensteinstraße 
 Nörvenich:  Bahnhofstraße, Marktplatz, Burgstraße, Am Kreuzberg
 Swinemünde: Lindenstrasse, heute ul. Armii Krajowej
 Gerasdorf bei Wien: unknown

Hermann-Göring-Plätze 
 Karlsruhe: Gottesauer Platz 
 Wien: Rooseveltplatz

Others
 Berge, Forst (Lausitz): Hermann-Göring-Damm, now Zasieki, destroyed
 Breslau:  Hermann Goering Sportfeld, Olympiastadion Breslau, now Stadion Olimpijski and camping
 Düren: originally Lendersdorfer Weg, later Hermann-Göring-Damm, after the war Dr.-Overhues-Allee
 Trier: Hermann-Göring-Stadion, Moselstadion
 Neuwied and Weißenthurm, Hermann-Göring-Brücke. Raiffeisenbrücke
 Lebenstedt, Salzgitter: Hermann-Göring-Stadt

References 

Hermann Göring
Goering